The 1909 ECHA season was the fourth and final season of the Eastern Canada Hockey Association (ECHA). Teams played a twelve-game schedule. The Ottawa Hockey Club would win the league championship with a record of ten wins, two losses and take over the Stanley Cup.

League business

Executive 
 Joe Power, Quebec (President)
 James Strachan, Wanderers (1st Vice-President)
 J. Eveleigh, Montreal (2nd Vice-President)
 Emmett Quinn, Quebec (Secretary-Treasurer)

The Eastern Canada Amateur Hockey Association league meeting was held November 4, 1908, and was a pivotal meeting in the evolution from amateur to professional ice hockey leagues. At the meeting the two last amateur, or at least partly amateur teams resigned over the signing of players from other teams. Montreal HC and Montreal Victorias left the league and later would continue as senior level men's teams playing for the Allan Cup. Unpaid players would no longer play with paid players.

The league would continue with four professional teams. The league name was changed to Eastern Canadian Hockey Association to reflect the change in status.

Regular season 
The Wanderers', Cecil Blachford had retired and Bruce Stuart had moved to Ottawa. New additions included Joe Hall, Harry Smith, Jimmy Gardner and Steve Vair. The Wanderers would come close to their rivals, finishing second with nine wins and three losses.

Ottawa saw Harvey Pulford and Alf Smith retire, and Tom Phillips leave. Ottawa would replace these players with Edgar Dey, Billy Gilmour and Albert 'Dubby' Kerr from the Toronto Professionals. Alf Smith would organize the Ottawa Senators of the Federal Hockey League.

Shamrocks added Harry Hyland, and Quebec saw the start of the career of Joe Malone.

Ottawa played an exhibition game prior to the season with the Toronto professionals on January 2 in Toronto. Toronto defeated Ottawa 5–4. Dubby Kerr played in the game for Toronto, and signed with Ottawa a week later.

On January 25, Wanderers played an exhibition game in Cobalt, Ontario, versus the Cobalt Silver Kings, betting $500 on themselves to win, but lost 6–4. After the game Harry Smith would leave the Wanderers to join Haileybury of the Timiskaming League.

Highlights 
The rivalry between Ottawa and Wanderers continued, Wanderers winning the first on January 6 7–6 in overtime, with Harry Smith scoring four against his former team. Ottawa would win the next 5–4 in Ottawa, and defeat Montreal in Montreal 9–8 before 8000 fans. Ottawa would finish the series winning 8–3 in Ottawa to clinch the championship.

Marty Walsh of Ottawa would win the scoring championship with 38 goals. Ottawa would average nearly ten goals per game.

Final standing

Stanley Cup challenges

Montreal vs. Edmonton 

Prior to the season, Wanderers would play a challenge against the Edmonton Hockey Club, champions of the Alberta Amateur Hockey Association. Despite all players except for one being a 'ringer' for Edmonton, Montreal would defeat them December 28–30, 1908, in Montreal. In game one, Harry Smith scored 5 goals as he led the Wanderers to a 7–3 victory. The Edmontons won game two, 7–6, but Montreal took the two-game total goals series, 13–10.

 Spares Edmonton: Bert Boulton, Harold Deeton, Jack “Hay” Miller
 Spares Montreal: Ernie Liffton, Ernie Russell.

 Spares Edmonton: Hugh Boulton, Howard McNamara, Tommy Smith.
 Spares Montreal: Ernie Liffiton, Ernie Russell.

Source: Coleman

After the challenge, Edmonton would play an exhibition game in Ottawa on January 2, defeating the Ottawa Senators (of the FHL) 4–2. Ottawa played the Toronto Pros the same day in Toronto, losing 5–4. Lindsay, Pitre and Vair, having played with Edmonton for the challenge, would sign after the exhibition game with Renfrew of the Federal League. The players would help Renfrew to the FHL championship.

After the season, Ottawa took over the Cup, but a series against the Winnipeg Shamrocks could not be arranged and no challenge was played. (The Shamrocks would fold before the next season and never played a challenge.) Challenges from Renfrew of the Federal Hockey League and Cobalt of the Timiskaming League were disallowed when the Stanley Cup trustees ruled that the players on Renfrew and Cobalt were ineligible, having joined their teams after January 2.

Post-season exhibition 

Ottawa and the Montreal Wanderers played a two-game series at the St. Nicholas Rink in New York on March 12 and March 13. Ottawa won the first game 6–4, and the second game was tied 8–8.

Schedule and results

Player statistics

Goaltending averages

Leading scorers

Stanley Cup engraving 
The 1909 Stanley Cup was presented by the trophy's trustee William Foran.

The following Ottawa Hockey Club players and staff were members of the Stanley Cup winning team.

1909 Ottawa Hockey Club Senators

See also 
 1909 FHL season
 List of pre-NHL seasons
 List of ice hockey leagues
 List of Stanley Cup champions

References

Notes

Bibliography
 
 Podnieks, Andrew; Hockey Hall of Fame (2004). Lord Stanley's Cup. Triumph Books, 12, 48. .

ECHA
Eastern Canada Amateur Hockey Association seasons